"She Sets the City on Fire" is a song by American singer Gavin DeGraw. It was released on July 15, 2016, by RCA Records as the lead single from the album Something Worth Saving. The song was written by DeGraw, Todd Clark, Jason Saenz, and Gregg Wattenberg, and produced by Wattenberg. The song peaked at number 16 on the Billboard Adult Top 40 chart.

Music video 
The music video was directed by Daniel Cz and features model Jessica Vargas as DeGraw's love interest who is the CEO of a technology company called "Orange" that is a spoof of Apple. The video shows DeGraw and Vargas as college students in a computer engineering lab during the 1980s as they work together to create the first video chat system.

Charts

Year-end charts

Certifications

References

2016 singles
Gavin DeGraw songs
Songs written by Todd Clark
Songs written by Gregg Wattenberg
2016 songs